Kamrangirchar is a Thana of Dhaka District in the Division of Dhaka, Bangladesh.

Geography

Demographics
This Kamrangirchar has an official population of 143,208. Males constitute 53.3% of the population, and females 46.7%. Kamrangirchar has an average literacy rate of 38.46%.

Trivia
 A 2006 survey of slums in Bangladesh found that the single largest concentration of slums in the Dhaka Metropolitan Area was in Kamrangir Char, and reported that of the (approx) 300,000 people living there, 265,000 are slum dwellers.

See also
 Upazilas of Bangladesh
 Districts of Bangladesh
 Divisions of Bangladesh

References

Thanas of Dhaka
Slums in Asia